The Arms Trade Treaty (ATT) is a multilateral treaty that regulates the international trade in conventional weapons.

It entered into force on 24 December 2014. 113 states have ratified the treaty, and a further 28 states have signed but not ratified it.

The ATT is an attempt to regulate the international trade of conventional weapons for the purpose of contributing to international and regional peace; reducing human suffering; and promoting co-operation, transparency, and responsible action by and among states.

The treaty was negotiated in New York City at a global conference under the auspices of the United Nations (UN) from 2–27 July 2012. As it was not possible to reach an agreement on a final text at that time, a new meeting for the conference was scheduled for 18–28 March 2013. On 2 April 2013, the UN General Assembly adopted the ATT.

International weapons commerce has been estimated to reach US$70 billion a year.

Origins
The roots of what is known today as the Arms Trade Treaty (ATT) can be traced back to the late 1980s, when civil society actors and Nobel Peace Prize Laureates voiced their concerns about the unregulated nature of the global arms trade and its impact on human security.

The ATT is part of a larger global effort begun in 1997 by Costa Rican President and 1987 Nobel Peace Prize laureate Óscar Arias. In that year, Arias led a group of Nobel Peace Prize laureates in a meeting in New York to offer the world a code of conduct for the trade in arms. This group included Elie Wiesel, Betty Williams, the Dalai Lama, José Ramos-Horta, representatives of International Physicians for the Prevention of Nuclear War, Amnesty International, and the American Friends Service Committee. The original idea was to establish ethical standards for the arms trade that would eventually be adopted by the international community. Over the following 16 years, the Arias Foundation for Peace & Human Progress has played an instrumental role in achieving approval of the treaty.

In 2001, the process continued with the adoption of a non-legally binding program of action at the United Nations Conference on the Illicit Trade in Small Arms. This program was formally called the "Programme of Action to Prevent, Combat and Eradicate the Illicit Trade in Small Arms and Light Weapons in All Its Aspects" (PoA).

Later put forward in 2003 by a group of Nobel Peace Laureates, the ATT was first addressed in the UN in December 2006 when the General Assembly adopted resolution 61/89 "Towards an Arms Trade Treaty: establishing common international standards for the import, export and transfer of conventional arms".

The ATT, like the PoA, is predicated upon a hypothesis that the illicit trade in small arms is a large and serious problem requiring global action through the UN. According to a well regarded 2012 Routledge Studies in Peace and Conflict Resolution publication, "the relative importance of diversion or misuse of officially authorised transfers, compared to international entirely illegal black market trafficking has been thoroughly confirmed." The authors go on to elaborate that, "For most developing or fragile states, a combination of weak domestic regulation of authorised firearms possession with theft, loss or corrupt sale from official holdings tends to be a bigger source of weapons concern than illicit trafficking across borders."

Development

UN resolution 61/89
On 18 December 2006, UK Ambassador for Multilateral Arms Control and Disarmament John Duncan formally introduced resolution 61/89, which requested that the UN Secretary-General seek the views of UN member states on the feasibility, scope, and draft parameters for a "comprehensive, legally binding instrument establishing common international standards for the import, export and transfer of conventional arms", and submit a report on the subject to the General Assembly. 94 states submitted their views, which are contained in the 2007 report A/62/278. Duncan was speaking on behalf of the co-authors (Argentina, Australia, Costa Rica, Finland, France, Japan, and Kenya). On behalf of the European Union, Finland highlighted the support for the effort, saying: "everyday, everywhere, people are affected by the side effects of irresponsible arms transfers ... As there is currently no comprehensive internationally binding instrument available to provide an agreed regulatory framework for this activity, the EU welcomes the growing support, in all parts of the world, for an ATT." 94 States submitted their views, which are contained in the 2007 report A/62/278.

In December 2006, 153 member states voted in favor of the resolution. Twenty-four countries abstained: Bahrain, Belarus, China, Egypt, India, Iran, Iraq, Israel, Kuwait, Laos, Libya, Marshall Islands, Nepal, Oman, Pakistan, Qatar, Russia, Saudi Arabia, Sudan, Syria, UAE, Venezuela, Yemen, and Zimbabwe.

Responding to procedural concerns that were not resolved before the final draft of the resolution, the UK said the aim of the initiative was to start a discussion on the feasibility and draft parameters of an Arms Trade Treaty, and that "agnostic" states would have a clear opportunity to engage in the process. After the vote, Algeria indicated that the effort must receive broad-based support from states and be based on the principles of the UN Charter.

Group of Governmental Experts
Resolution 61/89 also requested the Secretary-General to establish a group of governmental experts, on the basis of equitable geographical distribution, to examine the feasibility, scope, and draft parameters for such a legal instrument, and to transmit the report of the group of experts to the General Assembly for consideration at its sixty-third session. On 28 September 2007, the Secretary-General appointed a Group of Governmental Experts from the following 28 countries: Algeria, Argentina, Australia, Brazil, China, Colombia, Costa Rica, Cuba, Egypt, Finland, France, Germany, India, Indonesia, Italy, Japan, Kenya, Mexico, Nigeria, Pakistan, Romania, Russia, South Africa, Spain, Switzerland, Ukraine, the United Kingdom, and United States. The group met three times in 2008, and published a final report on the issue.

Preparatory Committee and Conference

In 2009, Óscar Arias, then in his second term as President of Costa Rica, introduced the Treaty at the United Nations, saying:

I return today, as a Rip Van Winkle of the modern era, to see that everything has changed except this. Peace continues to be a step further away. Nuclear and conventional weapons still exist despite the promises. It is up to us to ensure that in twenty years we do not awaken to the same terrors we suffer today. I am not ignorant of the fact that the biggest arms dealers in the world are represented here. But today I do not speak to the arms manufacturers, but rather to the leaders of humanity, who have the responsibility to put principles before profits, and enable the promise of a future in which, finally, we can sleep peacefully.

In that same year, an Open-ended Working Group—open to all States—held two meetings on an arms trade treaty. A total of six sessions of this Group were planned. However, at the end of 2009, the General Assembly of the United Nations decided by resolution A/RES/64/48 to convene a Conference on the Arms Trade Treaty in 2012 "to elaborate a legally binding instrument on the highest possible common international standards for the transfer of conventional arms". The decision was influenced by the change in position of the United States (the largest arms producer and only country voting against resolution 61/89), which took place upon a change in leadership from George W. Bush to Barack Obama, on the condition they were "under the rule of consensus decision-making needed to ensure that all countries can be held to standards that will actually improve the global situation."

Adoption of the Treaty 

The UN General Assembly of 2 April 2013 (71st Plenary Meeting) adopted the ATT as a resolution by a 154-to-3 vote with 23 abstentions. North Korea, Iran, and Syria voted in opposition. China and Russia, among the world's leaders in weapon exports, were among the 23 nations that abstained. Cuba, India, Indonesia, Myanmar, Nicaragua, Saudi Arabia, and Sudan also abstained. Armenia, Dominican Republic, Venezuela, and Vietnam did not vote.

The treaty was opened for formal signature by all states in New York on 3 June 2013. It entered into force on 24 December 2014, 90 days after the date of the 50th ratification.

Content

The UN Office for Disarmament Affairs claimed the treaty would not interfere with domestic arms commerce or the right to bear arms in its member states; ban the export of any type of weapon; harm the legitimate right to self-defence; or undermine national arms regulation standards already in place.The Arms Trade Treaty obligates member states to monitor arms exports and ensure that weapons don't cross existing arms embargoes or end up being used for human-rights abuses, including terrorism. Member states, with the assistance of the U.N., will put into place enforceable, standardized arms import and export regulations (much like those that already exist in the U.S.) and be expected to track the destination of exports to ensure they do not end up in the wrong hands. Ideally, that means limiting the inflow of deadly weapons into places like Syria.Advocates of the treaty say that it only pertains to international arms trade, and would have no effect on current domestic laws. These advocates point to the UN General Assembly resolution starting the process on the ATT. The resolution explicitly states that it is "the exclusive right of States to regulate internal transfers of arms and national ownership, including through constitutional protections on private ownership."

Criticism

Opposition to the ATT can be broken down into state opposition and civil society opposition. Over thirty states have objected to various parts of the ATT during negotiations, the majority of which held strong concerns about the implications for national sovereignty. From a civil society point of view, groups concerned about national sovereignty or individual rights to armed defense have been negative of the ATT. While not fundamentally opposed to an ATT, these groups are keenly sensitive to ensuring an ATT does not undermine national constitutional protections and individual rights. The most vocal and organized civil society groups opposing aspects of the ATT originated from the United States. These groups include the National Rifle Association (NRA), the National Shooting Sports Foundation, the Second Amendment Foundation, and The Heritage Foundation. The NRA and the Gun Owners of America say that the treaty is an attempt to circumvent the Second Amendment and similar guarantees in state constitutions in order to impose domestic gun regulations.

One of the largest sources of civil opposition to the ATT has come from the Institute for Legislative Action (ILA), which is the lobbying arm of the NRA. In July 2012, ILA stated that:Anti-gun treaty proponents continue to mislead the public, claiming the treaty would have no impact on American gun owners. This is a bald-faced lie. For example, the most recent draft treaty includes export/import controls that would require officials in an importing country to collect information on the "end user" of a firearm, keep the information for 20 years, and provide the information to the country from which the gun was exported. In other words, if you bought a Beretta Shotgun, you would be an "end user" and the U.S. government would have to keep a record of you and notify the Italian government about your purchase. That is gun registration. If the U.S. refuses to implement this data collection on law-abiding American gun owners, other nations might be required to ban the export of firearms to the U.S.On 12 July 2012, the United States issued a statement condemning the selection of Iran to serve as vice president of the conference. The statement called the move "outrageous" and noted that Iran is under UN Security Council sanctions for weapons proliferation.

Canada was accused by Project Ploughshares, a Canadian human rights group, of violating the treaty, as well as its own laws, by selling "Group 2" types of high-tech imaging and targeting systems to Turkey to conduct its air campaigns in the Syrian civil war.

Advocated contents
International non-government and human rights organizations including Amnesty International, Oxfam, the Arias Foundation for Peace and Human Progress, Saferworld, and the International Action Network on Small Arms (who lead the Control Arms Campaign) have developed analysis on what an effective ATT would look like.

It would ensure that no transfer is permitted if there is substantial risk that it is likely to:
 be used in serious violations of international human rights or humanitarian law, or acts of genocide or crimes against humanity;
 facilitate terrorist attacks, a pattern of gender-based violence, violent crime, or organized crime;
 violate UN Charter obligations, including UN arms embargoes;
 be diverted from its stated recipient;
 adversely affect regional security; or
 seriously impair poverty reduction or socioeconomic development.

Loopholes would be minimized. It would include:
 all weapons—including all military, security, and police arms, related equipment and ammunition, components, expertise, and production equipment;
 all types of transfer—including import, export, re-export, temporary transfer, and transshipment, in the state sanctioned and commercial trade, plus transfers of technology, loans, gifts, and aid; and
 all transactions—including those by dealers and brokers, and those providing technical assistance, training, transport, storage, finance, and security.

The Amnesty International website "loopholes" include shotguns marketed for deer hunting that are virtually the same as military/police shotguns and rifles marketed for long range target shooting that are virtually the same as military/police sniper rifles. Amnesty International advocates that the civilian guns must be included in any workable arms trade controls; otherwise, governments could authorize export/import of sporting guns virtually the same as military/police weapons in function.

It must be workable and enforceable. It must:
 provide guidelines for the treaty's full, clear implementation;
 ensure transparency—including full annual reports of national arms transfers;
 have an effective mechanism to monitor compliance;
 ensure accountability—with provisions for adjudication, dispute settlement, and sanctions;
 include a comprehensive framework for international cooperation and assistance.

NGOs are also advocating that the ATT must reinforce existing responsibilities to assist survivors of armed violence, as well as identify new avenues to address suffering and trauma.

Signatories and parties 

As of December 2022, 113 states have ratified or acceded to the ATT, including six of the world's top 10 arms producers (France, Germany, Spain, China, the United Kingdom and Italy). Twenty-one ratifying states provisionally applied articles 6 and 7 of the treaty, pending its entry into force. The strong support of the European Union for this treaty is seen in its ATT Outreach Project (ATT-OP) established by EU Council Decision 2013/768/CFSP.

Notes 

A further 28 states have signed but not ratified the treaty:

Notes

See also 
 Disarmament
 Mine action
 Small Arms and Light Weapons (SALW)

References

External links

 Official website
 Website of the United Nations conference on the Arms Trade Treaty
 Text of the Arms Trade Treaty
 Arms Trade Treaty on  the ICRC official website

2013 in New York City
Arms control treaties
Arms trafficking treaties
Treaties concluded in 2013
Treaties entered into force in 2014
Treaties of Afghanistan
Treaties of Albania
Treaties of Andorra
Treaties of Antigua and Barbuda
Treaties of Argentina
Treaties of Australia
Treaties of Austria
Treaties of the Bahamas
Treaties of Barbados
Treaties of Belgium
Treaties of Belize
Treaties of Benin
Treaties of Bosnia and Herzegovina
Treaties of Bulgaria
Treaties of Burkina Faso
Treaties of Cape Verde
Treaties of the Central African Republic
Treaties of Chad
Treaties of Costa Rica
Treaties of Croatia
Treaties of Cyprus
Treaties of the Czech Republic
Treaties of Denmark
Treaties of Dominica
Treaties of the Dominican Republic
Treaties of El Salvador
Treaties of Estonia
Treaties of Finland
Treaties of France
Treaties of Gabon
Treaties of Georgia (country)
Treaties of Germany
Treaties of Ghana
Treaties of Greece
Treaties of Grenada
Treaties of Guatemala
Treaties of Guinea
Treaties of Guinea-Bissau
Treaties of Guyana
Treaties of Hungary
Treaties of Iceland
Treaties of Ireland
Treaties of Italy
Treaties of Ivory Coast
Treaties of Jamaica
Treaties of Japan
Treaties of Latvia
Treaties of Lesotho
Treaties of Liberia
Treaties of Liechtenstein
Treaties of Lithuania
Treaties of Luxembourg
Treaties of Madagascar
Treaties of Mali
Treaties of Malta
Treaties of Mauritania
Treaties of Mauritius
Treaties of Mexico
Treaties of Moldova
Treaties of Monaco
Treaties of Montenegro
Treaties of the Netherlands
Treaties of Namibia
Treaties of Niger
Treaties of Nigeria
Treaties of Norway
Treaties of Panama
Treaties of Paraguay
Treaties of Peru
Treaties of the Philippines
Treaties of Poland
Treaties of Portugal
Treaties of Romania
Treaties of Saint Kitts and Nevis
Treaties of Saint Lucia
Treaties of Saint Vincent and the Grenadines
Treaties of Samoa
Treaties of San Marino
Treaties of Senegal
Treaties of Serbia
Treaties of Seychelles
Treaties of Sierra Leone
Treaties of Slovakia
Treaties of Slovenia
Treaties of South Africa
Treaties of South Korea
Treaties of Spain
Treaties of Suriname
Treaties of Sweden
Treaties of Switzerland
Treaties of Togo
Treaties of Trinidad and Tobago
Treaties of Tuvalu
Treaties of the United Kingdom
Treaties of Uruguay
Treaties of Zambia
Treaties adopted by United Nations General Assembly resolutions
Treaties extended to the Caribbean Netherlands
Treaties of Brazil
Treaties of the State of Palestine
Treaties of Kazakhstan
Treaties of Cameroon
United Nations treaties